Childs Glacier is a glacier in the Neptune Range of the Pensacola Mountains, draining westward from Roderick Valley to enter Foundation Ice Stream. It was mapped by the United States Geological Survey from surveys and from U.S. Navy air photos, 1956–66, and named by the Advisory Committee on Antarctic Names for John H. Childs, a builder at Ellsworth Station, winter 1958.

See also
 List of glaciers in the Antarctic
 Glaciology

References
 

Glaciers of Queen Elizabeth Land